Savino Bellini (born 1 December 1913 in Portomaggiore; died 4 November 1974 in Portomaggiore) was an Italian footballer who played as a midfielder.

Honours
Juventus
 Coppa Italia winner: 1937–38, 1941–42.

External links

1913 births
1974 deaths
Italian footballers
Serie A players
S.P.A.L. players
Novara F.C. players
Juventus F.C. players
A.C. Milan players
S.S.D. Varese Calcio players
Inter Milan players
Association football midfielders